Pirgula delicata is a moth of the subfamily Lymantriinae. It is found in eastern Madagascar.

The male of this species has a wingspan of 26 mm.
Head and front are white, thorax clear straw yellow, antennae white with yellow pectinations, abdomen straw yellow.
The wings are white with few scales. On the forewings there are two V-shaped fine black lines open to the base. A little black spot at the base.
Hindwings with not connected black spots in V-shape. This species is close to Pirgula polyopha Collenette, 1959 from which it can be distinguished by the black lines that are much more developed at P.polyopha.

The holotype was found near Moramanga.

References

Lymantriinae
Moths described in 1973
Moths of Madagascar
Moths of Africa